Nicole T. Lee is an American politician in Chicago, Illinois. She is a member of the Chicago City Council as the alderwoman for the 11th ward, which includes portions of Bridgeport, New City, and Chinatown. She took office in March 2022, after being appointed to fill the vacancy created by the removal of Patrick Daley Thompson. She is the second Asian American and first Chinese American to serve on the City Council.

Early life and education 
Lee was born and raised in the Chinatown neighborhood of Chicago. She attended Mark Sheridan Math and Science Academy and Whitney Young Magnet High School. She received a bachelor's degree in public affairs from Indiana University and a master's degree in public policy from University of Chicago.

Career 
Prior to her appointment to City Council, Lee was an executive at United Airlines and worked on philanthropy and corporate social responsibility efforts. She had previously worked in several executive roles for Private Bank, BP America, and other corporations. She has also served as an independent consultant for community organizations, president of the Chicago chapter of the Organization of Chinese Americans, interim executive director and board member of the Chinese Mutual Aid Association, and a member of the University of Illinois at Chicago Asian American Advisory Council. From 2017 to 2021, she served on the local school council for Haines Elementary School.

Chicago City Council

Appointment 
On February 14, 2022, incumbent 11th ward alderman Patrick Daley Thompson was removed from his position after his conviction for federal tax fraud charges made him ineligible to serve. The office of Mayor Lori Lightfoot, charged with nominating a replacement, announced on March 15 that it had received 27 applications. Lightfoot nominated Lee on March 24, citing her "dedication to empowering communities and building coalitions." On March 28, the City Council approved her appointment in a 45-0 vote. Lee stated that her top three priorities for the ward were city services provision, public safety, and educational opportunities.

Personal life and family 
Lee's father, Gene Lee, was a long-time political aide for former Chicago Mayor Richard M. Daley. He pled guilty to charges of embezzlement and fraud, unrelated to his position as an aide, in 2014.

See also 
 List of Chicago aldermen since 1923

Notes

References 

21st-century American politicians
Indiana University alumni
Living people
University of Chicago alumni
Year of birth missing (living people)
People from Chicago
Chicago City Council members appointed by Lori Lightfoot